Kopna Góra  is a village in the administrative district of Gmina Supraśl, within Białystok County, Podlaskie Voivodeship, in north-eastern Poland.

An arboretum and a cemetery of Polish November insurgents of 1831 are located in Kopna Góra.

References

Villages in Białystok County